Neil Vijay Salvi (born 21 May 1965) is an Indian-born English educator and a former businessman and first-class cricketer.

Salvi was born in Gwalior in May 1965. He emigrated to England with his parents at a young age, where he studied mathematics at Christ Church, Oxford. While studying at Oxford, he played first-class cricket for Oxford University in 1986 and 1987, making five appearances. He scored 131 runs in his five matches, averaging 18.71 with a high score of 36.

Salvi later studied for an MBA at INSEAD. After graduating, he went into business founding a number of start-ups. He later left business to become a schoolteacher, teaching firstly at Highgate School before moving to Oundle School in 2018. Salvi is married with two daughters.

References

External links

1965 births
Living people
People from Gwalior
Indian emigrants to England
Alumni of Christ Church, Oxford
English cricketers
Oxford University cricketers
INSEAD alumni
English businesspeople
Schoolteachers from London
Schoolteachers from Northamptonshire